Ducové is a municipality (village) situated in western Slovakia, near the spa town of Piešťany. It was part of the municipality Moravany nad Váhom from 1976 to 1992. The village lies under the Váh Inovec. According to the 2011 census, the municipality had 375 inhabitants. 365 of inhabitants were Slovaks and 10 others and unspecified.

Etymology
The name of the village is derived from dux-ducis meaning duke. Duka was also a borrowed word used by the Slavs for a person with a prominent social status. The village was known as 1348 Duchreuy, 1453 Duczev, 1521 De-chobrod, 1532, 1638 Ducibrod, 1576 Ducybrod, 1636 Duczowa, 1664 Ducó, 1667 Duczo, 1668 Duczove, 1693 Duczowa, 1753 Duczó, 1776 Duczo, 1773 Duczo, Dutzo, Duczowe, 1786 Duczo, Duczowce, 1808 Duczó, Ducow, 1863 -1918 Ducó, 1920 Ducov, Ducové, 1927 Ducové.

Great Moravian Court

Ducové is known for an archaeological site on the Kostolec hill, where a Great Moravian fortified settlement has been unearthed. Excavations of older settlements from the Stone Age, Bronze Age and the Roman era indicate that Ducové benefited from its location on the Amber Road well before the Great Moravian era. The Slavic court was founded in the mid-9th century after the fall of the nearby hill fort in Pobedim, frequently associated with the unification of principality of Moravia and Nitra. The court was similar to Frankish courts from the 8th-9th centuries and inhabited by representatives of the Slavic elite. It was protected by a massive oak palisade, doubled on one side and built on top of the prehistoric mound. Administrative and representative functions were highlighted by the strategic location near the river ford. Interior space was divided by additional palisades and occupied by residential buildings, outbuildings, a Christian rotunda church and a graveyard. The round rotunda with an apse is similar to rotunda found in Staré Město. The court existed until 940-970 when it burned, most likely during the attack of the old Hungarians. The rotunda and the graveyard had been used by neighbouring villages also after the destruction of the residential buildings, the rotunda until the 11-12 century and the graveyard until the 14th.

The site is registered as a National Cultural Landmark. Some parts of the court (such as its palisades) have been reconstructed by archaeologists.

See also
 List of municipalities and towns in Slovakia

References

Sources

Genealogical resources

The records for genealogical research are available at the state archive "Statny Archiv in Bratislava, Slovakia"

 Roman Catholic church records (births/marriages/deaths): 1783-1905 (parish B)
 Lutheran church records (births/marriages/deaths): 1783-1922 (parish B)

External links

The official website of the village of Ducové 
Surnames of living people in Ducove

Villages and municipalities in Piešťany District
Castles in Slovakia
Archaeological sites in Slovakia
Great Moravia
Rotundas in Europe